Drasteria habibazel is a moth of the family Erebidae. It is found in Tunisia.

References

Drasteria
Moths described in 1922
Moths of Africa